The first Romanian film animation was Păcală în Lună by Aurel Petrescu (5 April 1920). Ion Popescu-Gopo is the founder of the modern Romanian cartoon school.

Selected list of Romanian animation

See also
Gopo's Little Man, a character that appears in many Ion Popescu-Gopo films.

 
Romanian art
Romanian culture''